The Correct Use of Soap is the third studio album by English post-punk band Magazine, released by Virgin Records in 1980. It contains some of Magazine's best-known and most popular songs, including the singles "A Song from Under the Floorboards" and "Sweetheart Contract" and their cover of Sly and the Family Stone's "Thank You (Falettinme Be Mice Elf Agin)". A different version of the album, entitled An Alternative Use of Soap, was released in Canada in 1980 by then-distributor Polygram Records.

It was Magazine's last album with original guitarist John McGeoch, who left the band after the release of the album and joined Siouxsie and the Banshees.

Content 
Some of the songs marked a return of sorts to the punkier riffs and faster rhythms of Real Life, after their second album, Secondhand Daylight.

Two songs on the album make reference to elements of works by Fyodor Dostoyevsky, namely "Philadelphia" (referring to Raskolnikov, the main character in Crime and Punishment) and "A Song from Under the Floorboards" (based on Notes from Underground).

The record sleeve design for this album, as for most other Magazine albums and singles, was by Malcolm Garrett.

Release 
The Correct Use of Soap peaked at number 28 on the UK Albums Chart. The tracks "A Song from Under the Floorboards", "Thank You (Falettinme Be Mice Elf Agin)" and "Sweetheart Contract" were released as singles. "Thank You" peaked at number 42 on the Billboard Dance Music/Club Play Singles chart in the United States, while "Sweetheart Contract" peaked at number 54 on the UK Singles Chart.

Following the release of the album, guitarist John McGeoch left Magazine and joined Siouxsie and the Banshees. McGeoch also played with Visage, formed by his Magazine bandmates Dave Formula and Barry Adamson. He was replaced by Robin Simon (ex-Ultravox, later with Ajantamusic) on the world tour promoting the album.

"A Song from Under the Floorboards" was featured on Rhino's 2004 box set Left of the Dial: Dispatches from the '80s Underground and has been covered many times in concert by fellow Mancunian Morrissey. It was also covered by Australian band My Friend the Chocolate Cake on their ARIA Music Award-winning album Brood (1994), and by Simple Minds on the 2CD edition of their 2009 album Graffiti Soul.

Live performances 
On 1 September 2009, Magazine performed the original album in its entirety during the first half of their show at the Royal Festival Hall in London.

Track listing 
All lyrics are written by Howard Devoto and all music is composed by Magazine (Barry Adamson, Howard Devoto, John Doyle, Dave Formula and John McGeoch), except where noted.

The Correct Use of Soap

An Alternative Use of Soap

Personnel 
Credits are adapted from the album's liner notes.

Magazine
 Howard Devoto – vocals
 John McGeoch – guitar, saxophone, backing vocals
 Barry Adamson – bass guitar, backing vocals
 Dave Formula – keyboards
 John Doyle – drums, percussion

Additional musicians
 Laura Teresa – additional backing vocals

Technical
 Martin Hannett – production
 Malcolm Garrett – artwork

Charts

Further reading

References

External links 
 

1980 albums
Magazine (band) albums
Virgin Records albums
Albums produced by Martin Hannett